Bruno Migliorini (19 November 1896 – 18 June 1975) was an Italian linguist and philologist. He was the author of one of the first scientific histories of Italian language and was president of the Accademia della Crusca.

Biography 
Migliorini was born in Rovigo.

He studied at Ca' Foscari university in Venice, then in the faculty of Letters of the University of Padua. After the Italian defeat in the Battle of Caporetto (1917), his family was forced to move to Rome. There, at the University La Sapienza, he met his masters, the philologists Ernesto Monaci and Cesare De Lollis, and, from 1920, collaborated to La Cultura, a journal whose founders included De Lollis himself and Giovanni Gentile.

He was chief editor of the Enciclopedia Italiana from 1930 to 1933, when he succeeded Angelo Monteverdi as professor of Romance languages and literatures at the University of Fribourg, where Migliorini remained until 1938. Thenceforth he was the first professor of History of Italian Language, a newly created position at the University of Florence, which he kept until 1967. In 1939, together with Giacomo Devoto, he founded the journal Lingua nostra ("Our Language").

From 1949 to 1963 Migliorini was president of the Accademia della Crusca and, from 1958, he was a member of the Accademia dei Lincei. He was one of the main Italian experts of Esperanto.

He is one of the authors of a standard pronouncing dictionary of Italian, the Dizionario d'ortografia e di pronunzia, or DOP.

He died in Florence on June 18, 1975.

Sources

References 

1896 births
1975 deaths
Italian lexicographers
Italian philologists
Linguists from Italy
People from the Province of Rovigo
20th-century linguists
20th-century philologists
20th-century lexicographers